7 mm Remington cartridges are all rifle cartridges with bullets of  diameter developed and sold by Remington.

These cartridges include:
.280 Remington (7mm Express Remington)
7mm BR Remington (Bench Rest)
7mm Remington Magnum
7mm Remington Ultra Magnum (RUM)
7mm Remington Short Action Ultra Magnum (SAUM)
7mm-08 Remington

See also
 7mm Shooting Times Westerner, standardized by Remington but originated as a wildcat
7mm caliber for other cartridges of this caliber
List of rifle cartridges

External links
Rifle Shooter Mag article on 7 mm cartridges

Pistol and rifle cartridges
Cartridge families
Remington Arms cartridges